Craig Patrick Fallon (18 December 1982 – 15 July 2019) was a British World Champion judoka.

Career
His first main coach was Bill Kelly. Fallon later competed with his coach Fitzroy Davis. In 2002, he won the gold medal in the under 60kg category at the 2002 Commonwealth Games in Manchester.

In September 2005, Fallon won the -60 kg weight class at the World Judo Championships in Cairo, beating Ludwig Paischer in the final. He became only the third British male to win a world title, following Neil Adams in 1981 and Graeme Randall in 1999. The following year in 2006, he went on to become European champion in Tampere, Finland in the -60 kg weight category beating Armen Nazaryan in the final. He is only the second male British judoka besides Neil Adams to simultaneously hold both a World and European title.

On 22 September 2007, Fallon went on to win The 2007 Men's World Cup in the -60 kg at the NIA Arena in Birmingham, he was the only Brit to win a medal at the Olympic ranking event. In 2011 Fallon won his third title at the British Judo Championships, having previously won in 2002 and 2008.

In 2012, the former Wolverhampton Judo Club ace was inducted into the Wolverhampton Sporting Hall of Fame.

In 2017, Fallon signed a contract as head coach of the Federal Judo Association of Vorarlberg, Austria. In 2019, Fallon made the move to Welsh Judo Association to become Head of Coaching.

Death
Fallon died on 15 July 2019. His body was found at the Wrekin, a beauty spot near Wellington in Shropshire. No cause of death was given. The coroner at the inquest judged that Fallon had died by suicide.

References

External links
 

1982 births
2019 deaths
2019 suicides
English male judoka
Judoka at the 2004 Summer Olympics
Judoka at the 2008 Summer Olympics
Olympic judoka of Great Britain
Sportspeople from Ipswich
Place of death missing
Commonwealth Games gold medallists for England
Judoka at the 2002 Commonwealth Games
World judo champions
Commonwealth Games medallists in judo
Medallists at the 2002 Commonwealth Games